Dresden & Johnston are an American DJ and production duo composed of Dave Dresden of Gabriel & Dresden and Mikael Johnston of Mephisto Odyssey.

History
Dave Dresden is the co-founder of the dance music acts Gabriel & Dresden and Motorcycle, remixer for acts like Jewel and The Killers, and the co-author of the dance floor hits As the Rush Comes, and Tracking Treasure Down. Mikael Johnston is the founding member of the Warner Bros. Records act Mephisto Odyssey who were pivotal in defining the nascent San Francisco house sound. Johnston has also collaborated remixed and engineered for artists such as Jane’s Addiction, Static-X, Los Amigos Invisibles, Soul Coughing, I Am the World Trade Center, Smash Mouth, The Matches, The Sounds and Goapele.

Johnston and Dresden had known each other for over a decade and started collaborating once Gabriel & Dresden had disbanded. The partnership was announced in February 2009 on Beatport. Their first work together were remixes of Lily Allen's song "The Fear" followed by Nadia Ali's "Love Story", both topped Billboard's Hot Dance Club Play Chart. This was followed by remixes for BT, JD Webb, The Crystal Method, Owl City, Morgan Page, Enrique Iglesias and Dev. Their remix of Enrique Iglesias' "Tonight (I'm Lovin' You)" reached number one on Billboard Hot Dance Club Play Chart.

Their first original production was "Keep Faith" featuring vocals by Mezo Riccio. Released in March 2010, the song charted at number 10 on Billboard Hot Dance Club Play Chart. Around the same time, remixes of their collaboration "That Day" with singer-songwriter Nadia Ali were released on compilation albums. In August 2010, the duo released their EP titled "The Cove/Redhead" and in November 2010 their second single "Metaphonix". Their first studio album tentatively titled High and Low is rumored for a 2011 release. The album contains collaborations with Morgan Page, Jan Burton, Skylar Grey, Nadia Ali, Mezo Riccio and David Penner of Andain.

Discography
Singles/EPs
 2010 "Keep Faith" (featuring Mezo Riccio)
 2010 "The Cove/Redhead"
 2010 "Metaphonix"

Compilations
 2010 Armin van Buuren - ASOT Radio Top 15 - "That Day" (Tritonal Remix) [feat. Nadia Ali and Mikael Johnston]
 2010 Myon & Shane 54 - International Departures Soundtracks - "That Day" (Myon & Shane 54 Remix) [feat. Nadia Ali and Mikael Johnston]
 2010 Menno De Jong - Intuition Sessions: Rio de Janeiro - "That Day" (Lenny Ruckus & Ana Vida Remix) [feat. Nadia Ali and Mikael Johnston]
 2010 Nadia Ali - Queen of Clubs Trilogy: Onyx Edition - "That Day" (Tritonal Remix) [feat. Nadia Ali and Mikael Johnston]
 2011 Sydney Blu - Nervous Nightlife: Live at Mansion - "That Day" (Sydney Blu Remix) [feat. Nadia Ali and Mikael Johnston]

Remixes
 2009 Lily Allen - "The Fear"
 2009 Nadia Ali - "Love Story"
 2009 JD Web - "Better Man"
 2009 BT - "Unbreakable"
 2010 The Crystal Method - "Black Rainbows"
 2010 Filo & Peri - "Soul and the Sun"
 2010 Morgan Page - "I've Had Friends"
 2011 Enrique Iglesias - "Tonight (I'm Loving You)"
 2011 Dev feat. Cataracs - "Bass Down Low"

References

External links
 

Living people
Ableton Live users
Club DJs
American DJs
DJs from San Francisco
American electronic musicians
Record producers from California
American trance musicians
American house musicians
Remixers
Electronic dance music DJs
Year of birth missing (living people)